Robert Peters Napper  (1818–1867) was a Quaker who published albums of photographs from Andalusia, Spain and the Vale of Neath, Wales.

Life
The son of Peter and Mary Napper, he was born in Newport, Wales on 23 December 1818.

He became interested in natural history and sailed for Sydney, Australia, in 1841. From there he went to collect specimens among the Aborigines around Moreton Bay, Queensland. He then moved on to business in Manila, Philippines for 12 years. In 1856 he returned to Britain via America, where he learnt about photography. He was a partner in a London photographic company, McLean, Melhuish, Napper & Co. from 1859 to 1861. He is most famous for photographs taken as an employee of Francis Frith in Spain, particularly Andalucia, in the early 1860s.

He died, after a year of illness, on 31 October 1867.

Publications

Views in Andalusia (1862), sold for '8 or 10 guineas 
Views in Wales. The Vale of Neath (by R. P. Napper. Photographed by the British and Foreign Portrait Company. With descriptive letterpress by C. H. Waring) (1864)

Photographic works
e.g.
Loja, Granada|Loja, from Views in Andalusia
Dinas Rock, from Views in Wales

References

1818 births
1867 deaths
19th-century Welsh photographers